The Butler Bulldogs football program is the intercollegiate American football team for Butler University located in the U.S. state of Indiana. The team competes in the NCAA Division I Football Championship Subdivision (FCS) and are members of the Pioneer Football League. Butler's first football team was fielded in 1887. The team plays its home games at the 7,500 seat Bud and Jackie Sellick Bowl (historically Butler Bowl) in Indianapolis. The Bulldogs are coached by Mike Uremovich.

History

Classifications
1937–1972: NCAA College Division
1973–1992: NCAA Division II
1993–present: NCAA Division I–AA/FCS

Conference memberships
1884–1915: Independent
1916–1917: Indiana College Athletic League
1918–1931: Independent
1932–1933: Missouri Valley Conference
1934–1947: Indiana Intercollegiate Conference
1947–1949: Mid-American Conference
1951–1989: Heartland Collegiate Conference
1990–1992: Midwest Intercollegiate Football Conference
1993–present: Pioneer Football League

Notable former players

Notable alumni include:
Bill Lynch
Arnold Mickens
Chris Salvi
Joseph "The Gentle Giant" Holzmer

Championships

Football Conference championships

Playoff appearances

NCAA Division I-AA/FCS playoffs
The Bulldogs have appeared in the FCS playoffs once, with an overall record of 0–1.

NCAA Division II playoffs
The Bulldogs made three appearances in the Division II playoffs, with a combined record of 0–3.

PFL Gridiron Classic results
From 2006 through 2009, the PFL and Northeast Conference (NEC) staged the Gridiron Classic, an exempted postseason football game that matched the champions of the two conferences which were technically members of Division I FCS, but which were not the recipients of automatic invitations to the football championship playoff at the time. The Bulldogs appeared in the PFL Gridiron Classic once, with an overall record of 1–0.

References

External links

 

 
American football teams established in 1887
1887 establishments in Indiana